Anotha Level was an American West Coast hip hop group composed of five members: Bambino, Ced Twice, Stenge, Stix and Stones.

Discography
Studio albums

Singles
 1994 – "What's That Cha Say"
 1994 – "Don't Stimulate"

References

External links
 Anotha Level discography at Discogs

Priority Records artists
Hip hop groups from California
African-American musical groups
Musical groups from Los Angeles
Musical groups established in 1994
Musical groups disestablished in 1995
Ice Cube
1994 establishments in California